Emociones is a 1978 album by Spanish singer Julio Iglesias.

Track listing
All tracks produced by Ramón Arcusa.

Personnel
Adapted from the Emociones liner notes:

Pepe Sánchez – drums
Carlos Villa – electric guitar, acoustic guitar
Eduardo Leyva – piano, keyboards
Eduardo Gracia – bass guitar
Rodrigo – acoustic guitar
Ramón Arcusa – producer, orchestral arrangements and direction
Rafael Ferro – orchestral arrangements and direction 
Juan Vinader – audio engineer
Don Gehman – audio engineer
Don Puluse – audio engineer

Charts

Weekly charts

Year-end charts

Sales and certifications

See also 
 1970s in Latin music
 List of best-selling albums in Argentina
 List of best-selling albums in France
 List of best-selling albums in Italy

References

1978 albums
Julio Iglesias albums